Baroness Decies may refer to:
Helen Beresford, Baroness Decies (1893–1936), née Gould, socialite and philanthropist, first wife of John Beresford, 5th Baron Decies
Elizabeth Wharton Drexel (1868–1944), author and Manhattan socialite, second wife of John Beresford, 5th Baron Decies